Chorrillana is a dish consisting of a plate of French fries topped with different types of sliced meat, sausages and other ingredients, most commonly scrambled or fried eggs, and fried onions.

Because of its large size, it is usually served as a dish to share. There are several recipes for the chorrillana, depending on the restaurant and the chef. The base of beef and fries is the only constant. Traditional recipes mix scrambled egg, fried onion and sliced beef. Some preparations may use chopped frankfurter sausages, chorizo, tomatoes and seasonings such as garlic or
oregano.

Chorrillana refers to a sweetish sauce that originated in the coastal resort town of Chorrillos, near Lima, Peru.

This dish is similar to the Québécois dish poutine and the Latin American dish salchipapa.

See also
 Chilean cuisine
 List of beef dishes
 Steak and eggs

References

 

Chilean cuisine
Beef dishes
Potato dishes
Sausage dishes
Egg dishes